Betasing is the Community & Rural Development Block headquarters situated 7 km from the district headquarters of South West Garo Hills, Ampati.

Demographics

Betasing Block of South West Garo Hills has a total population of 72,103 as per the census of 2011. Out of which 36,340 are males and 35763 are females.

Religion

About 45,545 of the people follow Christianity while 20,181 follow Hinduism. Unaffiliated and other religions make up the rest of the population.

Languages 

About 92% of the population are Tribals. Hajong, Garo and Koch are the major tribes in the Community and Rural Development Block.

References

South West Garo Hills district
Cities and towns in South West Garo Hills district